James David Rubadiri lukin Hendricks (19 July 1930 – 15 September 2018) was a Malawian diplomat, academic and poet, playwright and novelist. Rubadiri is ranked as one of Africa's most widely anthologized and celebrated poets to emerge after independence.

Education and career
Rubadiri attended King's College, Budo, in Uganda from 1941 to 1950, then Makerere University in Kampala (1952–56), where he graduated with a bachelor's degree in English literature and History. Between 1960 and 1962, he studied Literature at King's College, Cambridge, earning an MA degree. He went on to receive a Diploma in Education from the University of Bristol.

At Malawi's independence in 1964, Rubadiri was appointed the country's first ambassador to the United States and the United Nations (UN). When he presented his credentials to President Lyndon B. Johnson at the White House on 18 August 1964, he expressed the hope that his newly independent country would get more aid from the USA; he said that Malawi needed help to build its democratic institutions and noted that Malawi was already receiving US economic and technical help. That same year Rubadiri appeared on the National Educational Television (New York City) series African Writers of Today.

Rubadiri left the Malawian government in 1965 when he broke with President Hastings Banda. As an exile, Rubadiri taught at Makerere University (1968–75), but he was again exiled during the Idi Amin years. He was also Visiting Professor of English Literature at Northwestern University in 1972. Rubadiri subsequently taught at the University of Nairobi, Kenya (1976–84), and was also briefly, along with Okot p'Bitek, at the University of Ibadan in Nigeria, at the invitation of Wole Soyinka. Between 1975 and 1980, Rubadiri was a member of the Executive Committee of the National Theater of Kenya. From 1984 to 1997, he taught at the University of Botswana, where he was dean of the Language and Social Sciences Education Department.

In 1997, after Banda's death, Rubadiri was reappointed Malawi's ambassador to the UN, and he was named vice-chancellor of the University of Malawi in 2000. He received an honorary doctorate from the University of Strathclyde in 2005.

Rubadiri died on 15 September 2018, aged 88, at Mzuzu Central Hospital.

Writings
Rubadiri's poetry has been praised as being among "the richest of contemporary Africa". His work was published in the 1963 anthology Modern Poetry of Africa (East African Publishers, 1996), and appeared in international publications including Transition, Black Orpheus and Présence Africaine.

His only novel, No Bride Price, was published in 1967. It criticized the Banda regime and was, along with Legson Kayira's The Looming Shadow, among the earliest published fiction by Malawians.

Selected works

 Growing Up With Poetry: An Anthology for Secondary Schools, 1989 
 Poems from East Africa (ed., with David Cook), 1971
 No Bride Price (novel), 1967
 Come To Tea (play), 1965
 "African Thunderstorm" (poem)

References

External links
 Curriculum Vitae United Nations biography

1930 births
2018 deaths
20th-century male writers
Alumni of the University of Bristol
Ambassadors of Malawi to the United States
Academic staff of Makerere University
Makerere University alumni
Malawian diplomats
Malawian novelists
Malawian poets
People from Ruvuma Region
Permanent Representatives of Malawi to the United Nations
Academic staff of the University of Botswana
Academic staff of the University of Malawi
Academic staff of the University of Nairobi
Vice-chancellors of universities in Malawi